The Bolivian Constituent Assembly 1944–1946 was elected on 2 July 1944.

Chamber of Deputies

Chamber of Senators 

 

MNR – Revolutionary Nationalist Movement.

PL – Liberal Party.

PIR – Revolutionary Left Party.

PSU – United Socialist Party.

PRS – Socialist Republican Party.

PRG – Genuine Republican Party.

PSI – Independent Socialist Party.

ind – independent.

Notes

Political history of Bolivia